La Prision de Santa Fe is the ninth full-length album released by the New Mexican musician Al Hurricane in 1980.

The lead single "(El Corrido De) La Prision De Santa Fe" is a song that tells the story of New Mexico State Penitentiary riot. According to Al Hurricane, he wrote the song to be "strictly narrative, not a subjective account or soapbox. The song does not attempt to assign blame."

Track listing

References

Al Hurricane albums
New Mexico music albums